The Ruparelia Group of Companies, commonly referred to as the Ruparelia Group, is a privately owned conglomerate in Uganda. Sudhir Ruparelia, a wealthy Ugandan businessman, is a shareholder in each of the companies in the Group.

Overview
As of February 2018, Ruparelia Group is mainly involved in education, real estate development and management, hotels, resorts, floriculture and broadcasting. Sudhir Ruparelia, the Group's founder and chairman, is the majority shareholder in the companies that comprise the group. In November 2012, Forbes Magazine estimated his net worth at US$900 million, making him the wealthiest individual in Uganda at the time.

History
As a young man in England, Sudhir Ruparelia successfully established a number of small businesses before returning to Uganda in the 1980s to take advantage of the improving political and business stability.

Subsidiary companies
As of May 2021, the companies of the Ruparelia Group included but were not limited to the following:

 Premier Recruitment Limited - Kampala
 Crane Management Services Limited - Kampala
 Delhi Public International School-Naguru, Kampala
 Goldstar Insurance Company Limited - Kampala
 Kabira Country Club - Bukoto, Kampala
 Kampala International School Uganda
 Kampala Parents' School
 Kampala Speke Hotel - Kampala
 Meera Investments Limited - Kampala
 Munyonyo Commonwealth Resort - Munyonyo
 Premier Roses Limited - Entebbe
 Rosebud Limited - Entebbe
 Sanyu FM 88.2 - Kampala
 Speke Apartments Limited - Kampala
 Speke Resort and Conference Center - Munyonyo, Kampala
 Kampala Tourist Hotel - Kampala
 Victoria University Uganda - Kampala
 Vcon Construction Uganda Limited
 The group owns commercial and real estate interests in Rwanda, South Sudan, the United Kingdom, and the United Arab Emirates.
 Pearl Business Park: In July 2021, the Group announced plans to establish an upscale business park on  that the group owns in the city of Kampala. The park will include a shopping mall, a five-star hotel and a modern hospital.

See also

 List of conglomerates in Uganda
 List of conglomerates in Africa
 Kampala Capital City Authority
 List of wealthiest people in Uganda

References

External links
  Ruparelia Group Homepage
 What next for Sudhir after losing Crane Bank to DFCU?

 
Financial services companies established in 1985
Conglomerate companies of Uganda
Kampala District
1985 establishments in Uganda